The Murray Masonic Hall is a historic Masonic building in Murray, Idaho. Built in 1884, it was listed on the National Register of Historic Places in 1987.

As of 2011 it continued to serve as a home for Coeur d'Alene Lodge #20.

References

Clubhouses on the National Register of Historic Places in Idaho
Italianate architecture in Idaho
Masonic buildings completed in 1884
Buildings and structures in Shoshone County, Idaho
Masonic buildings in Idaho
National Register of Historic Places in Shoshone County, Idaho